Cabinet of Stanko Radmilović was the last cabinet of the Socialist Republic of Serbia, whose official title was Executive Council of the Assembly of the Socialist Republic of Serbia. It was formed on December 5, 1989, and dissolved on February 11, 1991.

During this cabinet's term, the League of Communists of Yugoslavia was dissolved, and soon after the first multi-party election took place in all the republics of the Socialist Federative Republic of Yugoslavia. On September 28, this cabinet adopted a new constitution which dropped the prefix "Socialist" from Serbia's official name, and called for the first multi-party general elections, which took place on December 9, 1990.

The Cabinet of Stanko Radmilović was dissolved after the Socialist Party of Serbia won an absolute majority on the parliamentary elections, and formed a new cabinet, with Dragutin Zelenović as the Prime Minister.

Cabinet members

See also
Socialist Republic of Serbia
Cabinet of Serbia
League of Communists of Serbia

References

Cabinets of Serbia
Cabinets established in 1989
Cabinets disestablished in 1991